Nõva may refer:

Places in Estonia
Nõva, Lääne County, village in Lääne-Nigula Parish, Lääne County
Nõva, Tartu County, village in Peipsiääre Parish, Tartu County
Nõva Parish, former municipality in Lääne County

People
Erika Nõva (1905–1987), Estonian architect

See also

Nova (disambiguation)